Vojka is a village and municipality in the Trebišov District in the Košice Region of eastern Slovakia.

Etymology
The name comes from Slavic , 'a small guardian group'. Rudolf Krajčovič assumes that it guarded the nearby salt storage in Soľnička.

References

Villages and municipalities in Trebišov District
Hungarian communities in Slovakia